Dawson River may refer to:

Dawson River (New South Wales)
Dawson River (Queensland)
Dawson River (Tasmania)